WDVT (94.5 FM) is a radio station broadcasting a classic rock music format branded as "Rock 94.5." Licensed to Rutland, Vermont, United States, the station serves the Lebanon-Rutland-White River Junction area. The station is currently owned by Pamal Broadcasting.

History
The station was originally assigned the call letters WHWB-FM on September 24, 1990. On April 15, 1991, the station changed its call sign to WYOY. On January 14, 1994, the call sign changed to WJEN. On February 8, 2008, the country format ("Cat Country") and WJEN call sign were moved to 105.3 FM, with 94.5 FM WDVT becoming the simulcast station. After two weeks of simulcasting its former format, WDVT became a classic hits station known as "The Drive." The new format began at 6:00 AM on February 22, 2008. The first song "The Drive" played was Bachman-Turner Overdrive's "You Ain't Seen Nothing Yet."

On August 31, 2018, the station flipped to classic rock with the new brand of "Rock 94.5."
 
WDVT is an affiliate station of the "Floydian Slip" Pink Floyd show.

The WDVT call sign was previously used in the early 1980s on a Philadelphia AM station, now operating as WURD.

References

External links

DVT
Radio stations established in 1990
Classic rock radio stations in the United States
1990 establishments in Vermont
Pamal Broadcasting